Ndzerem is a Grassfields Bantu language spoken in Cameroon.

References

Nun languages
Languages of Cameroon